The British Broadcasting Corporation (BBC) occupies many properties in the United Kingdom, and occupied many others in previous years.  The headquarters of the corporation is Broadcasting House in London; with many other divisions located in London and around the UK. Since 2007 the BBC has been developing a significant base at MediaCityUK in Salford, to which it has relocated several departments. There are also production bases in Belfast, Birmingham, Bristol, Cardiff and Glasgow. The BBC also owns news bureaux and relay stations outside the UK.

Current properties

London

England outside London

Northern Ireland

Scotland

Wales

British Crown dependencies

Abroad
In addition to the domestic bases, the BBC has numerous bases overseas to monitor the global news organisations and to gather news stories. The BBC itself does not publish the exact location of each of their news bureau in case of attack or harassment of staff because of their employment by the broadcaster, which aims to be politically neutral.

In addition to the above properties, the BBC also own radio relays including the Limassol BBC Relay on Cyprus.

Former BBC properties
Throughout the years, the BBC has used a number of different properties that have been sold or vacated by the corporation

See also

 BBC
 BBC Television
 BBC Radio

References
 
 
 
  No longer active

External links

 About The BBC - Buildings

Properties
BBC offices, studios and buildings